Luddenham railway station is a proposed station on the Western Sydney Airport line that will serve Luddenham. It is scheduled to open in 2026.

References

Proposed Sydney Metro stations
Railway stations scheduled to open in 2026